Ivan Petrovich Bakayev (1887  25 August 1936) was a Russian Bolshevik revolutionary, Soviet politician and statesman. A member of the Left Opposition, he was a defendant at the first Moscow show trials.

Biography 
Bakayev was born into a poor peasant family in Saratov province, Russia, and joined the Russian Social Democratic Labour Party as an 18-year-old, during the 1905 revolution, in Kamyshin - where the local RSDLP branch had not split between Bolsheviks and Mensheviks, as it had in other cities, and where he was one of the organisers of an armed uprising. He joined the Bolsheviks in 1906, and worked for them illegally in Baku, Astrakhan, and, from 1910, in St-Petersburg. He was arrested several times, and spent six years in prison altogether. At the time of the February Revolution, in 1917, he was working as a lathe operator in a factory in Petrograd (St Petersburg). During the October Revolution, he was deputy secretary, and later secretary of the Petrograd Soviet. During the Russian civil war, he was a political commissar with the Red Army on the Ural and Petrograd fronts. In September 1919-August 1920, he chairman of the Petrograd Cheka, then, after the Red Army conquest of Siberia, he headed Cheka in the South-East territory.

Persecution of the church 
Bakayev returned to Petrograd in 1922. He took charge of the attempt to force the head of the Russian Orthodox Church, Metropolitan Veniaman (Benjamin) to recognise the pro-Soviet 'Renovationist' church. He supervised the seizure of church property, and ordered the Metropolitan to rescind the excommunication of renovationist priests. When he refused, the Metropolitan was arrested, tried with 10 others, and executed. (In 1992, he was declared a saint.)

Opposition to Stalin 
In 1924-26,  Bakayev was chairman of the Communist Party Control Commission for the Leningrad province. In December 1925, when a rift between the Leningrad party organisation, headed by Grigory Zinoviev, and supported by Lev Kamenev and the centre, controlled by Josif Stalin, Bakayev backed the opposition. He was expelled from the executive of the Central Control Commission on 14 November 1927, and from the Communist Party in December 1927. He then capitulated, along with Zinoviev, Kamenev and the other leaders of the Leningrad opposition, and was readmitted to the communist party in 1928, and held various economic posts.

Arrest and execution 
Bakayev was arrested in December 1934, in the wake of the assassination of Sergey Kirov, with other former members of the Leningrad opposition, but where it was announced that there was  not enough evidence to bring Zinoviev and others before a court, Bakayev was reported to be under 'further investigation'. He was tried in secret, along with Zinoviev and others, on 16 January 1935, and sentenced to eight years in prison. According to one survivor from the Gulag, Bakayev had co-operated with the NKVD, giving evidence against the other accused, for which he was attacked by old comrades after they had been removed to prison in Chelyabinsk. He was brought back to Moscow to be a defendant at the first Moscow show trial, in August 1936, at which Bakayev 'confessed' to being implicated in the Kirov murder, describing himself as "an obedient tool in the hands of Zinoviev and Kamenev (and) an agent of the counter-revolution.". Sentenced to death on 24 August, he was shot the following day.

Along with his co-defendants, Bakayev was 'rehabilitated' by the USSR Supreme Court on 13 July 1988.

Personality 
The writer Victor Serge knew Bakayev in 1919, and wrote that "Bakayev was a handsome fellow of about thirty, with the careless appearance of a Russian village accordion player; indeed he liked to wear a smock with an embroidered collar and a coloured border, just like such a player. In the performance of his frighful duty he exercised an impartial will and a scrupulous vigilance."

References

1887 births
1936 deaths
Old Bolsheviks
Cheka officers
Left Opposition